Illuminations may refer to:

Shows and festivals
IllumiNations: Reflections of Earth, a nightly fireworks show currently at Epcot at Walt Disney World Resort
IllumiNations, original nightly firework show at Epcot at Walt Disney World Resort before Reflections of Earth was created
Illuminations (festival), a secular autumn festival of electric lights held in several English cities
Blackpool Illuminations, an annual lights festival in the British seaside resort of Blackpool
Disney Illuminations, a nightly firework show at Disneyland Paris

Music and video
Illuminations (Alice Coltrane and Carlos Santana album) or the title song, 1974
Illuminations (Buffy Sainte-Marie album), 1969
Illuminations (Erik Friedlander album), 2015
Illuminations (Josh Groban album), 2010
Illuminations (McCoy Tyner album) or the title song, 2004
Illuminations (Wishbone Ash album), 1996
Illuminations (EP), by Little Boots, 2009
Illuminations (video), by the Tea Party, 2001
 Les Illuminations (Britten), a 1940 song cycle by Benjamin Britten setting texts by Rimbaud
Illuminations, a 1950 ballet by Sir Frederick Ashton to Britten's Les Illuminations

Other uses
Illuminations (film), a 1976 Australian film
Illuminations (poetry collection), an 1886 book by Arthur Rimbaud
Illuminations (novel), a 2012 fictionalized biography of Hildegard of Bingen by Mary Sharrat
Illuminations: Stories, 2022 short story collection by Alan Moore

See also
Illumination (disambiguation)